James Fithie was a chaplain at Trinity Hospital in Edinburgh. He was imprisoned on the Bass Rock for about a year between 1685 and 1686.

Early life

James Fithie graduated from the University of Edinburgh with an MA on 9 July 1656. He was made a prisoner for holding conventicles, and ordered to be liberated from the Edinburgh Tolbooth 4 July 1679. Fithie was chaplain of Trinity Hospital, Edinburgh, a situation to which he was elected by the Town Council on 20 January 1671.  He had attended his own parish church, and received baptism for his children from the regular incumbent of the parish. But his sympathies being on the side of the persecuted Presbyterians, he had given evidence of this in several ways, and on various occasions. On this account he was apprehended, and lay in one of the jails of Edinburgh for some time previous to July 1679, when he was released. He was again arrested about the beginning of the year 1685, and imprisoned in the Bass in April. He was allowed liberty to walk on the rock, with an allowance of eightpence a day, on account of his poverty, by an order of 19 September 1685.

Release
He made a petition to the Council after his wife became sick and some of his children died. He was released in March 1686 by an order of the Council, in consideration of his own ill health, and the afflicted condition of his family. After he was set free he had to periodically reappear before the Council to retain his liberty. He was admitted to Peebles 17  November 1687. He died 25 December 1689, aged about 53.

Other names
Wodrow, in his History, (vol. iii. p. 151,) calls him by mistake " James Forthie." This has led Dr Crichton, in his list of the Bass prisoners annexed to his Memoirs of Mr John Blackadder, erroneously to suppose that the person whom Wodrow calls in that place " James Forthie," is different from " James Futhy," whose imprisonment in the Bass in 1685, is recorded by that historian in vol iv. p. 215. It is the same person who is spoken of in both places. Crichton is also mistaken in representing "James Forthie", or more correctly "James Fithie", as imprisoned in the Bass in 1679. That he was not imprisoned there at that time, is evident from what is stated in M'Crie's Appendix, No. I. pg 379. Porteous calls him James Fithy.

Family
He married Elizabeth Reid, who survived him, and had children: Elizabeth, served heir 3 November 1691 (married, pro. 20 November 1691, John Elliot, writer, Edinburgh: Edin. Horn., 26 December 1693).

Bibliography
Wodrow's Hist., iii., iv. 
Crichton's Memoirs of Blackadder 
Inq. Bet. Gen., 7185
Dickson's Emeralds Chased in Gold

References

17th-century Presbyterian ministers
Covenanters
1689 deaths
Scottish prisoners and detainees
Covenanting Prisoners of the Bass Rock
17th-century Ministers of the Church of Scotland